The Fifth Legislative Council of Hong Kong was the fifth meeting of the legislative branch of the Hong Kong Special Administrative Region Government. The membership of the LegCo is based on the 2012 election. The term of the session is from 1 October 2012 to 30 September 2016, during the term in office of the Chief Executive Leung Chun-ying. Due to the new arrangements agreed in a contentious LegCo vote in 2010, the session consists of the new total of 70 seats in LegCo, ten more than previously, with 35 members elected in geographical constituencies through direct elections, and 35 members in functional constituencies, in which five District Council (Second) functional constituency seats each represent all 18 District councils of Hong Kong voted for by all resident voters in Hong Kong (who did not have a vote in any other functional constituency). The Democratic Alliance for the Betterment and Progress of Hong Kong remained the largest party while the pan-democrats secured the one-third crucial minority. Notable new members of the LegCo members include Gary Fan from the new established party Neo Democrats and first openly gay councillor, People Power's Ray Chan Chi-chuen.

Major events

2012–13
 8 November 2012: Motion on "Equal rights for people of different sexual orientations", moved by Cyd Ho, was negatived.
 13 December 2012: Motion on "Vote of no confidence in the Chief Executive", moved by the Democratic Party's Wu Chi-wai, in response to the illegal structures scandal of Leung Chun-ying's residences was voted down by the Pro-Beijing camp.
 16 January 2013: Chief Executive Leung Chun-ying presented his first policy address to the Council.
 27 February 2013: The 2013–14 Budget Speech was delivered by the Financial Secretary, Mr John C Tsang, in the Legislative Council.
 24 April – 21 May 2013 : Five radical pan-democrats People Power and League of Social Democrats started filibustering by moving a total of 710 amendments on the Budget Appropriation Bill debate, to press for a universal pension scheme and a HK$10,000 cash handout. The government warned that the service would shut down if the budget bill do not pass. President of the Legislative Council Jasper Tsang ordered to end the filibuster on 13 May after 55 hours spent to debate 17 of the 148 amendments. The Appropriation Bill was passed on 21 May 2013 with 684 amendments negatived.

2013–14

 9–10 October 2013: Motion under the Legislative Council (Powers and Privileges) Ordinance, moved by Kwok Ka-ki of the Civic Party, to seek to appoint a select committee to inquire into the incident of the Secretary for Development Paul Chan Mo-po owning farmland located in the areas of the North East New Territories New Development Areas Project was negatived.
 16 October 2013: Second attempt of the motion on "Vote of no confidence in the Chief Executive" by the pan democrats was negatived.
 8 November 2013: Charles Mok moved a motion under Legislative Council (Power and Privileges) Ordinance to order the Secretary for Commerce and Economic Development Gregory So to attend before the Panel on Information Technology and Broadcasting to give evidence in the processes of vetting and approval of domestic free television programme service licence applications, after the application for the license of the Hong Kong Television Network Limited being negatived by the Executive Council. The motion and the amendment by Civic Party's Dennis Kwok were defeated. Thousands of protestors gathered outside of the Legislative Council building showing support for the Hong Kong Television Network Limited.
 19 March 2014: Motion moved by Claudia Mo of the Civic Party under the Legislative Council (Powers and Privileges) Ordinance to appoint a select committee to inquire into the immediate termination of the contract of Li Wei-ling, a radio host of Hong Kong Commercial Broadcasting Company Limited ("Commercial Radio"), and the alleged political interference by the government with the editorial independence of Commercial Radio, was negatived.

2015–16
 11 March 2016: The HK$19.6 billion extra funds for controversial Guangzhou–Shenzhen–Hong Kong Express Rail Link (XRL) project was passed by the Financial Committee in a sudden vote despite fierce protests and filibustering from the pan-democratic legislators. The pan-democrats questioned the procedure set by the acting chairman Chan Kam-lam who only approved 36 of the 19 pan-democratic legislators' 1,262 motions.

Major legislation

Enacted
 17 April 2013: Import and Export (General) (Amendment) Regulation 2013
 21 May 2013: Appropriation Bill 2013
 22 May 2013: District Council (Amendment) Bill 2013

Proposed
 18 June 2015: Motion Concerning the Amendment to the Method for the Selection of the Chief Executive of Hong Kong Special Administrative Region
 4 March 2016: Copyright (Amendment) Bill 2014

2015 Hong Kong electoral reform

On 18 June 2015, right before the vote, pro-Beijing legislator Jeffrey Lam Kin-fung led a walk-out of members of the Democratic Alliance for the Betterment and Progress of Hong Kong (DAB), the Business and Professionals Alliance for Hong Kong (BPA), most members of the Hong Kong Federation of Trade Unions (FTU) and other pro-Beijing legislators, leaving five Liberal Party legislators, Chan Yuen-han of the FTU and two other pro-Beijing independents remained in the chamber. The government's reform proposal failed as 8 legislators voted in favour and 28 votes against. All 27 pan democrats who had vowed to vote down the reform did so, as did one pro-Beijing legislator Leung Ka-lau representing the Medical constituency. Lam explained that the walk-out was an impromptu attempt to delay the division after the chairman denied his request for a 15-minute recess so that his party member Lau Wong-fat, who was delayed, could cast his vote in favour of the Beijing-backed reforms. However, enough legislators remained in the chamber that quorum was met and the proposal was voted down while most of the pro-Beijing legislators were outside. Nine pro-Beijing legislators, including five Liberal Party members, stayed behind out of confusion, and only eight of them voted in favour of the package, giving the rest of the world the false impression there was no support for the blueprint.

Composition

Note: Italic represents organisations that still function but become under another affiliation.

Graphical representation of the Legislative Council

Current Legislative Council of Hong Kong seat composition by party.

Leadership

 President: Jasper Tsang (DAB)

Convenors
 Pro-Beijing camp: Ip Kwok-him (DAB)
 Pro-democracy camp:
 Emily Lau (Democratic), 2012–2013
 Frederick Fung (ADPL), 2013–2014
 Alan Leong (Civic), 2014–2015
 Cyd Ho (Labour), 2015–2016

List of members
The following table is a list of LegCo members elected on 9 September 2012 in the order of precedence.

Members who did not serve throughout the term are italicised. New members elected since the general election are noted at the bottom of the page.

Key to changes since legislative election:
a = change in party allegiance

b = by-election

By-election

 28 February 2016, Alvin Yeung elected and replaced Ronny Tong who resigned on 1 October 2015.

Other changes

2012
 Andrew Leung (Industrial), Jeffrey Lam (Commercial), Lau Wong-fat (Heung Yee Kuk), Abraham Razack (Real Estate and Construction), Priscilla Leung (Kowloon West), Lo Wai-kwok (Engineering) and Christopher Cheung (Financial Services) – members from the Economic Synergy, Professional Forum, and few independents formed a loose new pro-business group the Business and Professionals Alliance for Hong Kong (香港經濟民生聯盟) on 7 October 2012.

2013
 Wong Yuk-man (Kowloon West) announced he was quitting People Power with immediate effect on 20 May 2013.

2015
 Ronny Tong (New Territories East) announced he was quitting the Civic Party on 22 June 2015 and would resign from the Legislative Council.

Committees
 Finance Committee— Chair: Tommy Cheung (2012–13, 2014–15), Ng Leung-sing (2013–14), Chan Kin-por (2015–16)
 Establishment Subcommittee— Chair: Wong Ting-kwong (2012–13), Regina Ip (2013–14, 2015–16), Kenneth Leung (2014–15)
 Public Works Subcommittee— Chair: Chan Kam-lam (2012–13), Lo Wai-kwok (2013–14, 2015–16), Alan Leong (2014–15)
 Public Accounts Committee— Chair: Abraham Shek
 Committee on Members' Interests— Chair: Ip Kwok-him
 House Committee— Chair: Andrew Leung 	
 Parliamentary Liaison Subcommittee— Chair: Emily Lau
 Committee on Rules of Procedure— Chair: Tam Yiu-chung

Panels
 Panel on Administration of Justice and Legal Services— Chair: Priscilla Leung (2012–15), Andrew Liao (2015–16)
 Panel on Commerce and Industry— Chair: Vincent Fang, (2012–14), Wong Ting-kwong (2014–16)
 Panel on Constitutional Affairs— Chair: Tam Yiu-chung
 Panel on Development— Chair: Lau Wong-fat (2012–14), Tony Tse (2014–16)
 Panel on Economic Development— Chair: Jeffrey Lam (2012–13, 2014–15), James Tien (2013–14, 2015–16)
 Panel on Education— Chair: Lam Tai-fai
 Panel on Environmental Affairs— Chair: Cyd Ho (2012–14), Chan Hak-kan (2014–16)
 Panel on Financial Affairs— Chair: Starry Lee (2012–14), Chan Kin-por (2014–15), Ng Leung-sing (2015–16)
 Panel on Food Safety and Environmental Hygiene— Chair: Alan Leong (2012–13), Helena Wong (2013–14), Tommy Cheung (2014–16)
 Panel on Health Services— Chair: Leung Ka-lau (2012–14), Joseph Lee (2014–16)
 Panel on Home Affairs— Chair: Ma Fung-kwok (2012–14), Starry Lee (2014–16)
 Panel on Housing— Chair: Wong Kwok-hing (2012–14), Alice Mak (2014–15), Christopher Chung (2015–16)
 Panel on Information Technology and Broadcasting— Chair: Wong Yuk-man (2012–14), Elizabeth Quat (2014–16)
 Panel on Manpower— Chair: Lee Cheuk-yan (2012–14), Wong Kwok-kin (2014–15), Kwok Wai-keung (2015–16)
 Panel on Public Service— Chair: Regina Ip (2012–14), Poon Siu-ping (2014–16)
 Panel on Security— Chair: Ip Kwok-him
 Panel on Transport— Chair: Chan Kam-lam (2012–14), Michael Tien (2014–16)
 Panel on Welfare Services— Chair: Chan Yuen-han (2012–14), Cheung Kwok-che (2014–16)

See also
 2012 Hong Kong legislative election

References

Terms of the Legislative Council of Hong Kong
2012 Hong Kong legislative election
2012 in Hong Kong
2013 in Hong Kong
2014 in Hong Kong
2015 in Hong Kong
2016 in Hong Kong
2012 establishments in Hong Kong
2016 disestablishments in Hong Kong